Fossane may refer to:

 fossa, (the animal)
 Fossane, a locality in Sogn og Fjordane, Norway